Nicktoons (later known as N-Toons) was a block on the French network Canal J, which launched the Nickelodeon brand in France. In 2005 a separate network launched to carry Nickelodeon, and the Canal J block was rebranded as N-Toons. The block later returned the reboot, used from October 21, 2011 until July 31, 2015 on the French version of Nickelodeon Wallonia.

External links
 www.nickelodeon.fr

Nicktoons (TV network)
Television channels and stations established in 2003
Television channels and stations disestablished in 2005
Television stations in France
2005 disestablishments in France